Montserrado-17 is an electoral district for the elections to the House of Representatives of Liberia. The district covers the St. Paul River District.

Elected representatives

References

Electoral districts in Liberia